Systenotheca is a monotypic plant genus in the buckwheat family containing the single species Systenotheca vortriedei, which is known by the common name Vortriede's spineflower.

Description
This is a small annual plant growing to a maximum of 15 centimeters in height, and easily identifiable with its red stems and foliage and white flowers.

Distribution
This wildflower is endemic to California, where it is native to the Santa Lucia Mountains of the central coast. This is an uncommon plant in its small native range where it grows in serpentine soil at some elevation.

References

External links 
 Jepson Manual Treatment
 Photo gallery

Monotypic Polygonaceae genera
Endemic flora of California
Santa Lucia Range
Natural history of the California chaparral and woodlands
Natural history of the California Coast Ranges
Natural history of Monterey County, California
Natural history of San Luis Obispo County, California
~
~